The following is a listing of characters appearing in the adult animated fantasy television series The Legend of Vox Machina, which was based on characters from campaign one of the web series Critical Role. The series premiered on Amazon Prime Video on January 28, 2022; the second season premiered on January 20, 2023.

Overview
List indicators
  = Main cast (credited) 
  = Recurring cast (3+ episodes)
  = Guest cast (1-2 episodes)

Vox Machina 
The animated series The Legend of Vox Machina mainly follows the titular Vox Machina, a party of adventurers known primarily for their exploits across the continent of Tal'Dorei. The characters are adapted from campaign one of the web series Critical Role.

Vex'ahlia Vessar
Vex'ahlia "Vex" Vessar (voiced by Laura Bailey), is a half-elf ranger and the twin sister of Vax'ildan. She studied dragons in the hope of eventually finding the one that killed her and Vax's mother. Vex feels a pain in her head whenever a dragon is close by. She is accompanied by Trinket (voiced by Matthew Mercer; Cheech Marin in Vex's Fey Realm hallucination), an armored bear companion she found as a cub and raised. Vex was treated poorly by her elven father Syldor due to her mixed heritage; Vax pushes her to run away with him following years of mistreatment by Syldor and the twins grow closer after running away. Upon returning to Syngorn as an adult, Syldor continues to dismiss both the twin's accomplishments and their quest for Fenthras, a Vestige of Divergence; Vex "defers to his anger and even chides Vax when he attempts to rebuke him". In an attempt to stand up for Vex, Percy informs Syldor that she is in fact Lady Vex'ahlia, Baroness of the Third House of Whitestone and Grand Mistress of the Gray Hunt which Syldor also dismisses. This prompts Vex to stand up for her friends and herself – "when Syldor smugly rebukes her, she continues. 'We won't fail, which is more than I can say about you as a father.'" After recovering and claiming Fenthras, Vex decides she's not ready to face her father again.

Percival de Rolo 
Percival "Percy" Fredrickstein Von Musel Klossowski de Rolo III (voiced by Taliesin Jaffe) is a human gunslinger. Percy's family were once the rulers of Whitestone – a city within Tal'Dorei. He barely escaped alive from a coup d'état led by the Briarwoods during which most of the rest of his family were killed—an event he was able to attain vengeance for during Season 1.

Pike Trickfoot
Pike Trickfoot (voiced by Ashley Johnson) is a gnome cleric of the goddess Everlight.

Vax'ildan Vessar
Vax'ildan "Vax" Vessar (voiced by Liam O'Brien) is a half-elf rogue and the twin brother of Vex'ahlia. His and Vex's mother was killed by a dragon before the events of the series.

Keyleth of the Air Ashari
Keyleth of the Air Ashari (voiced by Marisha Ray) is a half-elf druid who is currently undergoing her Aramenté – a quest which acts as the Ashari trial of leadership.

Scanlan Shorthalt
Scanlan Shorthalt (voiced by Sam Riegel) is a gnome bard known for his music and innuendo. He is not shy about his promiscuity.

Grog Strongjaw
Grog Strongjaw (voiced by Travis Willingham) is a goliath barbarian, who is always ready to fight.

Other characters by fictional location

Emon
Emon is the capital of the kingdom of Tal'Dorei and is located on the continent's western shore. The city is attacked by the dragons of the Chroma Conclave at the end of the first season.
Sovereign Uriel Tal'Dorei (Khary Payton): the ruler of the kingdom of Tal'Dorei. Sovereign Uriel entrusts the task of hunting down an unidentified beast burning the farmlands to Vox Machina because he is impressed with Vex's bear, Trinket. Following Vox Machina's defeat of the Briarwoods, he renounces his throne and cedes the government to the Tal'Dorei Council due to his failure in leadership. This proclamation in the Cloudtop District is interrupted by an attack from multiple chromatic dragons. He is killed by Raishan's toxic breath during the attack.
Sir Fince (Tony Hale): an elf member of the Tal'Dorei Council who doesn't quite believe in Vox Machina and their skills. Vox Machina suspect that he is secretly working for the dragon attacking the farmlands and stealthily follow Fince to General Krieg's mansion. However, when they confront him within the mansion, Fince is killed by Krieg.
General Krieg (David Tennant): a member of the Tal'Dorei Council who leads the military, and is secretly the evil blue dragon Brimscythe. After arguing in favor of hiring Vox Machina to defeat an unidentified beast before the council, he fights Vox Machina in his draconic form and nearly kills the group. He then burns down a village and wipes out a battalion of Emon soldiers; as General Krieg, he acts as one of the few survivors. During Vox Machina's investigation of Sir Fince, they break into Krieg's mansion and follow Krieg through a portal into a cavern, where Krieg reveals that he is Brimscythe as he shifts forms. During the ensuing battle, Vax realizes the dragon's weakness is its neck — Vox Machina comes together to allow Grog to land the killing blow.
Lady Kima of Vord (Stephanie Beatriz): a halfling member of the Tal'Dorei Council and a paladin of The Law Bearer. She and Allura previously fought and imprisoned the red dragon Thordak with the help of the Fire Ashari until he was released through unknown means.
Lady Allura Vysoren (Indira Varma): a human wizard and a member of the Tal'Dorei Council. She and Kima previously fought and imprisoned the red dragon Thordak with the help of the Fire Ashari until he was released through unknown means.
Shaun Gilmore (Sunil Malhotra): a human sorcerer who is the owner of the magical shop Gilmore's Glorious Goods and is friends with Vox Machina, specifically Vax. Separated by the Chroma Conclave's initial attack, Vox Machina make their way to Gilmore's shop to regroup.  After finding Gilmore in the wreckage of his shop, Pike partially heals him and he allows the group to take whatever they want for free. They gather supplies before Gilmore uses an emergency teleportation crystal to bring them all back to Vox Machina's keep on the outskirts. Following the white dragon Vorugal's attack on the keep, Gilmore flees to Whitestone with Vox Machina. Vax is informed by Keeper Yennen that Gilmore will get the care he needs.
Captain Jarrett Howarth (Eugene Byrd): the captain of the Arms of Emon.

The Fey Realm

 Garmelie (Billy Boyd): a spontaneous and irreverent satyr who follows the twins, Keyleth and Percy for entertainment, and inspiration for his lewd drawings. He later guides them to Syngorn and then the Shademurk Bog, where a Vestige of Divergence is located. After members of Vox Machina defeat Saundor, Garmelie opens a portal back to Tal'Dorei for them as payment for entertaining him. He transforms into a man with pointed ears and long, curly red hair after Vox Machina steps through the portal.
 Saundor (Sendhil Ramamurthy): a cursed archfey trapped within a tree in the Shademurk Bog who wielded the bow Fenthras, a Vestige of Divergence. He attempted to ensnare Vex through her pain over her father's mistreatment of her, however, Vex defeats him and takes Fenthras.

Syngorn

Syngorn is a city of elves – it was teleported to the Fey Realm after the Chroma Conclave attacked Emon.

 Ambassador Syldor Vessar (Troy Baker): Vex and Vax's elven father who is an ambassador for the elven city of Syngorn. He treated the twins poorly due to their mixed heritage, which led them to run away from home.
 Devana Vessar (Toks Olagundoye): Vex and Vax's elven step-mother who is more civil to the twins.
 Velora Vessar (Jayla Lavender Nicholas): Vex and Vax's elven half-sister who is happy to meet them.

Vasselheim

Vasselheim is the capital of the continent of Issylra. It is predominantly a religious city with several districts, each dedicated to a patron deity.

Highbearer Vord (Sumalee Montano): the leading dignitary of The Platinum Sanctuary, who refuses to help Vox Machina with the dragons.
Earthbreaker Groon (Ike Amadi): a human monk and dawn marshal of the Stormlord. He fought Grog at the Stormlord's arena to push Grog to see what gives him his strength.
Victor (Mercer): the eccentric proprietor of a black powder shop where Percy deduces Ripley resupplied. He is missing two fingers on his right hand and most of his hair.

Westruun

Kevdak (Ralph Ineson): Grog's uncle who leads the marauding Herd of Storms and wields the Titanstone Knuckles, a Vestige of Divergence. He brutally beat Grog with the Knuckles and left him for dead when Grog didn't uphold the standards of the Herd by allowing an elderly gnome to flee the Herd's attack. He has agreed to pay tribute to the dragon Umbrasyl in exchange for ruling Westruun. Grog challenges him to single combat for the herd, and he later kills him during the battle between Vox Machina and the herd.
Zanror (Abubakar Salim): Kevdak's son who reluctantly has to serve Umbrasyl with his herd. He challenges his father and is beaten as a result. After killing Kevdak, Grog makes Zanror leader of the herd, and he later helps Vox Machina trap and fight Umbrasyl.
Kaylie (Aisling Franciosi): A gnome who travels with a band of bards until they're stuck in Westruun. Scanlan helps her and a few people escape the town. During a party to celebrate the herd's freedom from Kevdak, Kaylie takes Scanlan to a inn's room, where she tells him that she's his daughter from a one-night stand. She at first wants to kill him for abandoning her mother and leaving her to raise her, but decides to let him live with the knowledge that he is a terrible father and person.

Whitestone
Whitestone is an independent city-state located on the continent's northeastern edge. It was ruled by the de Rolo family until a coup d'état led by the Briarwoods; the first season focuses on Vox Machina's fight with the Briarwoods and their reclamation of the city.
Lady Delilah Briarwood (Grey Griffin): a necromancer who ruled Whitestone with her husband Sylas after seizing power after they overthrew and killed the de Rolo family. She has necromantic abilities from her studies as a wizard and a mysterious connection to her patron, "The Whispered One," whom she is conducting a ritual for. During the fight with Vox Machina, Delilah attempts to complete the ritual early at the ziggurat beneath Whitestone Castle. The ritual seemingly fails because it was performed before the solstice, summoning only a spinning black orb in place of the Whispered One. Distracted by this, Delilah is shot twice in the back by Percy and is then killed by Cassandra when she attempts to escape. Griffin also voices Percy and Cassandra's mother Lady Johanna de Rolo in flashbacks.
Lord Sylas Briarwood (Mercer): a vampire who was the self-proclaimed caretaker of Whitestone, Percy's home city. It was he, along with his wife Delilah, who overthrew and killed the de Rolo family several years prior. During the fight with Vox Machina, Keyleth eventually kills him by channeling the power of the Sun Tree into a blast of sunlight. Grog recovers his sword after the fight, which seems to whisper to him.
Lord Frederick de Rolo (Jaffe): Percy and Cassandra's father who was the previous lord of Whitestone before he and most of his family are killed by the Briarwoods and their allies. Mainly appears in flashbacks.
Cassandra de Rolo (Esmé Creed-Miles): Percy's sister who was left under the care of the Briarwoods. The Briarwoods used magic to charm her under their will, however, she is freed from this magic when Sylas is killed. Cassandra kills Delilah when she attempts to escape Vox Machina. Cassandra is left in charge of Whitestone when Vox Machina departs for Emon.
Sir Kerrion Stonefell (Darin De Paul): the Briarwoods' duergar captain of the guard who participated in killing the de Rolo family. When Percy executes him, his name is magically erased from Percy's gun upon his death.
Duke Vedmire (Rory McCann): the Briarwoods' goliath enforcer. He is killed by townspeople when they rose up to defend Whitestone from a horde of undead.
Professor Anders (Stephen Root): Percy's former tutor who is in league with the Briarwoods after betraying the de Rolos. He attacks Vox Machina and uses magic to take control of Grog, Vex, Keyleth and Vax to force them to try and kill Percy. When he is killed by Percy, his name dissipates from Percy's gun barrel.
Archibald Desnay (Dominic Monaghan): a dwarf who is a Whitestone rebel leader and Percy's childhood friend. He is rescued by Vox Machina, however, he is later killed by Vedmire during the onslaught of undead released by the Briarwoods.
Keeper Yennen (Gina Torres): a religious leader in Whitestone who secretly supports the rebellion. The character was an old man in the original campaign. She might have died, when Raishan is revealed to be disguised as her.
Dr. Anna Ripley (Kelly Hu): one of the de Rolo family's murderers who tortured Percy; she eventually turns against the Briarwoods and is imprisoned in Whitestone Castle. After being released by Vox Machina on the condition of her offering them information on the Briarwoods, she successfully escapes from both Vox Machina and the Briarwoods. She later goes to Westruun to inform Umbrasyl of Vox Machina and their plan against the Conclave. She is then shown to be working with Umbrasyl on a quest to gather the Vestiges of Divergence for themselves, for the promise of resources from Umbrasyl. After Umbrasyl's death, she flees to fight another day.

Other characters by fictional organization

Ashari 

Vilya (Janet Varney): Keyleth's mother and a member of the Air Ashari. She left for her Aramenté when Keyleth was young, and was last seen in Pyrah. 
Korrin (Fred Tatasciore): Keyleth's father and the headmaster of the Air Ashari. He, along with Allura and Kima, helped Cerkonos fend off fire elementals when the fire plane was opened until Vox Machina came to their aid. 
Cerkonos (Robbie Daymond): the headmaster of the Fire Ashari in Pyrah, and one of the guardians of the portal to the Elemental Plane of Fire where Thordak was imprisoned.

Chroma Conclave
A group of powerful dragons who have come together to conquer Tal'Dorei; this is unusual as dragons don't normally get along.
Thordak (Lance Reddick): A fire breathing red dragon; he is the leader of the Conclave. Also known as the "Cinder King"; he was imprisoned by Allura, Kima, and the Fire Ashari until he was mysteriously freed. His ultimate goal is to gather all of Tal'Dorei's gold to create an army of dragons to conquer Exandria. 
Raishan (Cree Summer): A green dragon who spews poisonous gas. She can disguise herself as other people, as evident by taking the form of Keeper Yennen and revealing herself to offer her assistance to defeat Thordak.
Umbrasyl (Mercer): A black dragon, which has acid rain drip from its wings melting those below. Following a lead from Ripley, he tracks down Vox Machina in the Rimecleft and in the ensuing battle kills the sphinx Kamaljiori and steals the Vestige known as Mythcarver. After another battle with Vox Machina, he gets killed by Scanlan wielding Mythcarver.
Vorugal (O'Brien): A white dragon that "flash-freezes victims with an explosion of ice".

Slayer's Take
Osysa (Alanna Ubach): a sphinx who is the patron of the Slayer's Take, a guild of hunters in Vasselheim. In order to develop the strength needed to defeat the Chroma Conclave, she gives Vox Machina the quest to recover the Vestiges of Divergence. These Vestiges are powerful magic items created during the Calamity to fight the gods themselves. To begin, Osysa directs Vox Machina to a nearby hidden temple for the Matron of Ravens which contains her armor known as the Deathwalker's Ward.
Kashaw Vesh (Will Friedle): a human cleric, also known as Kash, who flirts with Keyleth.
Zahra Hydris (Mary Elizabeth McGlynn): a tiefling warlock who holds a grudge towards Vax and Vex for previously stealing a reward for the guild and resents that Osysa revealed the Vestiges to Vox Machina. She convinces Kashaw that they should recover the Deathwalker's Ward instead of Vox Machina.

Temple of the Everlight
The Everlight (Tracie Thoms): the goddess of healing, one of the Prime Deities and Pike's patron deity.
The Head Cleric (Anjali Bhimani) of the Everlight: she helps Pike on her crisis of faith journey.

Additional characters

 Mercer as: 
 Orthax: a shadow demon who possessed Percy's pepperbox to help him kill those who killed his family, with the intent to take his soul as well. Scanlan destroys him after throwing Percy's pepperbox into a pool of acid.
 Craven Edge: a sentient sword formerly owned by Lord Briarwood which is now in the possession of Grog. It gives off an evil aura, which is noticed by both Earthbreaker Groon and Pike. Grog later destroys it, after he almost kills Pike with the sword, but is left with diminished physical strength.
 Kamaljiori (Tony Plana): Osysa's mate who will only disclose the location of the other Vestiges to Vox Machina if one of them can wound him. Scanlan is the only one who manages to do so—performing a lamenting love song that hurts Kamaljiori emotionally. After gifting Mythcarver to Scanlan; Kamaljiori is killed by Umbrasyl in a battle for the Vestige. His head is later seen in Umbrasyl's lair, as a part of the dragon's hoard.
 Wilhand Trickfoot (Henry Winkler): Pike's great-great-grandfather who is a devout follower of the Everlight. He was saved by a young Grog when the Herd of Storms attacked his settlement. Wilhand brought Pike to heal Grog as Grog was kicked out of the Herd and left for dead for saving Wilhand. He later helps Pike and Scanlan remove the corruption caused by Craven Edge, which should allow Grog to recover his strength.
 The Matron of Ravens (Courtenay Taylor): the goddess of death who makes Vax her champion, the one who balances life and death on her behalf, in exchange for Vex's life.

Reception 
Madison Durham, for Polygon in 2022, wrote that "the characterization of Keyleth in the animated series is entirely consistent with how Ray played her in the show, refined and honed for this new format" and acts as "redemption" for the character. During the first season, Durham comments that the audience "not only to see Keyleth overcome small moments of uncertainty, but are also treated to the visualization of her power — power she wields first as small blooms of flowers or vines, that blossoms into blazing orbs of pure sunlight and towering walls of ice. Members of her own party are forced to acknowledge her prowess". She also highlighted the changes to Keyleth and Vax's romance and called it a "deft move on the part of the writers and animators". Andrea Towers, for TV Insider in 2023, wrote that "the animated series is doing something remarkable: it's opening up Keyleth to an entirely new segment of fans, both new and old, who are falling in love with her endearing nature and struggles with self-confidence and seeing her in an entirely different way than people did a few years ago. The narrative of the show — especially the second season, which is allowing the character to come into her own and take on more responsibility — is proving that the very things that made the character so contentious in the first place are the things that make her one of, if not the most, valuable and relatable character in the adventuring group".

Brenton Stewart, for CBR in 2022, commented that while many members of Vox Machina fit "classical fantasy tropes," Percy resists "almost any box of a fantasy archetype fans might try to fit him into" which makes him "more unique and interesting each time his backstory unravels". Stewart wrote that "part of The Legend of Vox Machina's fun is that the characters are so diverse, there is something different for everyone and a little something to enjoy in each of them. The show would not be the same if it focused on Percy alone, yet it's hard to make any comparisons where he does not stand out as the most unique character worthy of focus".

Madison Durham, for Polygon during the show's second season, wrote that "Vex'ahlia is not on the surface someone who is in any way fragile. She is bold, and self-confident, and unremorseful about the things she wants. She can also be prickly and stubborn. Beneath her bravado, though, lurks a very big heart. Big enough to rescue an orphaned bear cub, fierce enough to protect her brother and her friends, and kind enough to welcome a half-sister with open arms". Durham highlighted the adaptation of Vex's conflict with her father and her fight with Saundor. She commented that "the animated series has done an amazing job at allowing all the characters in the show to stand on their own feet — in particular, they've been writing the women of the show beautifully".

James Grebey, for Vulture in 2023, commented on the character design of the Chroma Conclave – "the stylistic choice to make the dragons computer generated, rather than the more traditional-looking animation of the human characters and backgrounds, sometimes sticks out, but it only makes [the Chroma Conclave's invasion of Emon] sequence even more effective. The Chroma Conclave is not normal. It is out of Vox Machina's league by an unfathomable degree". Grebey highlighted the abilities of each dragon and on Thordak, he wrote "lest you think a normal fire-breathing dragon seems generic after his fellow dragons' unique, gruesome abilities, the series does something new and awe inspiring when the Thordak's fire turns into a brilliant white beam that instantly levels the city".

Notes

References

Critical Role
Lists of characters in American television adult animation
Lists of fantasy television characters
Lists of action television characters